Government Inter College Deoria or GIC Deoria 
is a historical college.
The old name of this college was King Edward High School. It was established on 8 October 1912. Its current principal is Mr. P. K. Sharma. There are hostels here and there is also two bicycle stand.

Admission 
Selection is made through written entrance test in English, Hindi and Math & Biology followed by an interview.

Students and faculty 
The students strength of the school is 4000. Total number of teachers are 50. There are 20 classrooms in college me of old students of this college are serving this college as a teacher, when they are selected as teacher by Madhya Shiksha Seva Chayan Board, Allahabad. Some of these teachers are Shri Govind Singh (Lecturer-Physics), YogendraNath Mishra (Lecturer-Hindi), Ashim Chaudhary (Lecturer-Mathematics), Vivekanand Mishra (Lecturer-Chemistry) etc.

Course of study 
The college follows the curriculum prescribed by the Madhyamik Shiksha Parishad, Uttar Pradesh (UP Board) and have classes from Primary (VI) to the Intermediate (Class XII) level. It prepares students for the UP Board Examination for Class X and Class XII. Value education is imparted as part of the curriculum.

School hours are from 7:00 am to 12:00 pm stared 1st shift.1st shirt in 11th,12th and 2nd shirt 6th to 12th. 12:00 pm to 5:pm started 2nd Shirt. The Office functions from 10:00 am to 5:00 pm.

Celebrating Annual Function 
GIC Deoria celebrates its foundation day on 8 October every year. On this day, all the students of Deoria, that is, those who have left after studying, all those people are called and honored. Due to COVID-19, it was stopped in GIC for 2 years i.e. 2019 and 2020. But it will be celebrated again in 2021.

Gallery

Notable alumni

 Surya Pratap Shahi  Cabinet Minister in Uttar Pradesh
 Girishwar Misra Former Vice Chancellor Mahatma Gandhi Antarrashtriya Hindi Vishwavidyalaya, author, professor, psychologist

See also
 Deoria
 Deoria district
 UP Board
 List of schools in India

External links

 Official website
 Govt. Inter College
 Basic Details for college

Intermediate colleges in Uttar Pradesh
Education in Deoria, Uttar Pradesh
1912 establishments in India
Educational institutions established in 1912